The Royal Order of the Polar Star (Swedish: Kungliga Nordstjärneorden) is a Swedish order of chivalry created by King Frederick I on 23 February 1748, together with the Order of the Sword and the Order of the Seraphim. The Order of the Polar Star is intended as a reward for Swedish and foreign "civic merits, for devotion to duty, for science, literary, learned and useful works and for new and beneficial institutions".

Its motto is, as seen on the blue enameled centre of the badge, Nescit Occasum, a Latin phrase meaning "It knows no decline". This is to represent that Sweden is as constant as a never setting star. The Order's colour is black. This was chosen so that when wearing the black sash, the white, blue and golden cross would stand out and shine as the light of enlightenment from the black surface. The choice of black for the Order's ribbon may also have been inspired by the black ribbon of the French Order of St. Michael, which at the time the Order of the Polar Star was instituted was also awarded to meritorious civil servants. At present, the ribbon of the Order is blue with yellow stripes near the edges (i.e., the national colors, but the reverse of the Order of the Sword's yellow ribbon with blue stripes near the edges). Women and clergymen are not called Knight or Commander, but simply Member (Ledamot).

From the reorganization of the orders in 1975 until 2023, the Order was only awarded to foreigners and members of the royal family, often being awarded to foreign office holders (such as prime and senior ministers) during Swedish state visits. It is also awarded to junior members of royal families who would not qualify for the more prestigious Royal Order of the Seraphim. In 2019, a parliamentary committee was instructed to establish guidelines on how to re-introduce the Swedish orders, including the Order of the Polar Star, into the Swedish honours system, and how Swedish citizens again can be appointed to Swedish orders. The committee presented its findings in September 2021 and the Government has declared that a bill on the subject would be presented to the Riksdag on April 19th 2022. The bill passed the Riksdag by a large majority on 19 June 2022. On 20 December 2022, the Swedish Government published a new regulation that repealed the 1974 regulation, and once again opened the Royal Orders to Swedish citizens again and reactivated the Sword Order and Vasa Order, which came into effect from 1 February 2023.

Grades 
The Order has five degrees:
 Commander Grand Cross (KmstkNO) – Wears the badge on a collar (chain) or on a sash over the right shoulder, plus the star on the left chest;
 Commander 1st Class (KNO1kl) – Wears the badge on a necklet, plus the star on the left chest;
 Commander (KNO) – Wears the badge on a necklet;
 Knight 1st Class (RNO1kl/LNO1kl) – Wears the badge on a ribbon on the left chest;
 Knight (RNO/LNO) – Wears the badge on a ribbon on the left chest.

Note:  A clergymen or woman is made a Ledamöte ("Member") instead of Commander or Knight.

The Order also has a medal: the "Polar Star Medal".

Insignia and habit 
 The collar of the Order is in gold, consists of eleven white-enamelled five-pointed stars and eleven crowned back-to-back monogram "F"s (for King Frederick I of Sweden) in blue enamel, joined by chains.
 The badge of the Order is a white enamelled Maltese Cross, in silver for a Knight and in gilt for a Knight 1st Class and above; crowns appear between the arms of the cross. The central disc, which is identical on both sides, is in blue enamel, with a white-enamelled five-pointed star surrounded by the Order's motto Nescit occasum ("It knows no decline"). The badge hangs from a royal crown.
 The star of the Order is a silver Maltese cross, with a silver five-pointed star at the centre. The star of a Grand Cross also has straight silver rays between the arms of the cross.
 The ribbon of the Order used to be black, but is now blue with yellow stripes near its borders (see above). In spring 2013, the Grand Master decided that Swedish royal princes would wear the Order with the original black ribbon, while other members would still use the blue with yellow stripes. The last black ribbon 18kt gold Knight class was awarded in 1988 to historian George Loper of Bridgeton, New Jersey, for his research which was the basis for the New Sweden Farmstead Museum. This was presented by the King.
 The Order used to have a distinctive red and white habit worn on formal occasions such as at chapters of the Order. The habit included red breeches and red doublet, both with padded shoulders and white piping, a white sash with a gold fringe around the waist and a red mantle with white lining. The star of the Order was embroidered on the left breast of both the doublet and the mantle. A black top hat with a gold hat band and a plume of white ostrich and black egret feathers and red boots with gilded spurs completed the habit.  The collar of the Order was worn over the shoulders of the doublet.  Clergymen of the Church of Sweden wore the Order around the neck with a white cassock with a red sash with a gold fringe around the waist and a red mantle with a white lining and with the star of the Order embroidered on its left side.

It is not known whether the current two-ribbon colour system will be kept after the re-introduction of the order for Swedish citizens on 1st February 2023. Currently only Swedish princes wear the original black ribbon colour, but up until now they are the only Swedes bestowed with the order. It is assumed they will be given the honour of being the only ones to wear the original pre-1975 black colour.

Gallery

See also 

 Orders, decorations, and medals of Sweden

References

Bibliography 

  Per Nordenvall, Kungliga Serafimerorden 1748–1998. Stockholm: Kungl. Maj:ts orden, 1998. 
  Order of the Polar Star, Royal Court of Sweden
 Hieronymussen, Paul; Struwing, Aage, (phot. ill.); Crowley, Christine (English trans.). Orders and Decorations of Europe in Color .   The MacMillan Company.  New York, 1967.  Originally published as Europaeiske Ordner I Faever. Politikens Forlag, 1966.  Color plates # 28-32; text pp. 126–127.
 Lawrence-Archer, J. H. The Orders of Chivalry from the Original Statutes of the Various Orders of Knighthood and other Sources of Information.  London:  W. H. Allen and Company, 13 Waterloo Place, Pall Mall, S. W. Publishers to the India Office.  1887.

External links 

Swedish Royal Court: Orders and medals

 
Awards established in 1748
1748 establishments in Sweden